John Thomas Harris (born September 13, 1954) is an American former professional baseball player. He played in Major League Baseball (MLB) for the California Angels. He is currently the manager for the Southern Maryland Blue Crabs of the Atlantic League of Professional Baseball.

Harris was born in Portland, Oregon. He attended Lubbock Christian University.  He was chosen in the 29th round of the 1976 Major League Baseball draft.  He played in the major leagues from 1979 until October 1981 — all with the California Angels.

He was the hitting coach of the Sioux Falls Canaries of the American Association in 2009 and alternated between the Shreveport-Bossier Captains in the American Association and the Amarillo Dillas of the United League in 2010 as the hitting coach.

In 2011, Harris was hired as the field manager of the Amarillo Sox of the American Association.

References

External links

1954 births
Living people
California Angels players
Quad Cities Angels players
Salinas Angels players
Salt Lake City Gulls players
Spokane Indians players
Indianapolis Indians players
Evansville Triplets players
Baseball players from Portland, Oregon
Lubbock Christian Chaparrals baseball players
Major League Baseball first basemen
Nashville Sounds players
Minor league baseball managers